Bath Roller Derby is a roller derby league based in Bath, Somerset. Founded in 2012, the league plays to the Women's Flat Track Derby Association (WFTDA) ruleset. The league has been a member of the United Kingdom Roller Derby Association (UKRDA) since May 2015.

League History 
The league was founded in 2012 by several local skaters as Bath Roller Derby Girls but rebranded in 2018 and dropped the 'Girls'. They held their first public session in September 2012 and henceforth began holding regular training sessions. Half a year later, the league held their second recruitment intake and numbers begun to increase with a third intake following in November of that year. 

In April 2014, they played their first international game against Lisbon Grrrls Roller Derby, taking home a 152–132 victory.

Bath won the 2018 Bath Sports Awards' Community Club of the Year award in 2018.

League skater Amy Buller (derby name Scarlett O’ Harma) died of breast cancer in September 2020, and the league have since hosted the "Peeka Hurt You Cup" in celebration of her life and to raise money for Dorothy House, a local hospice charity.

League Structure 
The league currently has two teams drawn from all league skaters:

 Bath Spartans (A Team)
 Bath Roman Rollers (B Team). 

The Bath Gladiators team is made up of those skaters not currently drafted to a Travel Team or currently injured and not skating. The Bath Skeleton Crew is the league's official crew, providing skating and non-skating officials (NSOs) for home and away games.

Five Nations Roller Derby Championships 
The league participated in the British Roller Derby Championships 2015 Women T4 South West tier. They played Wiltshire Roller Derby, North Devon Roller Derby, Bridgend Roller Derby and Riot City Ravens, winning three out of their four games. This performance qualified them for Women T4 Playoffs - Western, where they won against North Wales Roller Derby, 165-128, but lost to Wirral Roller Derby's Savage Lilies, 294-78.

In 2016, they found themselves in Women Tier 3 South. They had a difficult start to the competition, losing their first four games against North Devon Roller Derby, Kent Roller Derby, Cornwall Roller Derby and Surrey Roller Girls, before beating Plymouth City Roller Derby.

A restructured tournament in 2017 saw the league in the Womens T3 Regional tier. They faced Granite City Roller Derby, Norfolk Roller Derby, Sheffield Steel Roller Derby, North Devon Roller Derby, Dorset Roller Girls, Riot City Ravens and Cornwall Roller Derby.

In 2018, they were promoted to Womens T2 UKRDA National in a further-restructured competition. They won their game against North Devon Roller Derby, but lost all their other games against SWAT Roller Derby, Royal Windsor Roller Derby, London Roller Derby's Batter C Power (C). 

Their performance qualified them in 2019 to compete in the Womens T1 Premier tier. They faced up to London Roller Derby's Batter C Power, Norfolk Roller Derby, SWAT Roller Derby and Cambridge Rollerbillies.

In 2021, the British Championships rebranded as the Five Nations Roller Derby Championships.

Ranked Games

The table below lists the bouts played by Bath Roller Derby Girls as recorded by Flat Track Stats

Unranked Events
This table lists unranked and one-day tournament events in which BRDG has competed

References

Roller derby in England
Roller derby leagues in the United Kingdom
Roller derby leagues established in 2012
Sport in Bath, Somerset
2012 establishments in England